James Robison Chapman (25 September 1855 – 12 April 1925) was an Australian politician.

He was born in Hawthorn in Melbourne. In 1922 he was elected to the Tasmanian Legislative Council as an independent member for Hobart. He served until his death in 1925.

References

1855 births
1925 deaths
Independent members of the Parliament of Tasmania
Members of the Tasmanian Legislative Council